Bulk Barn is a Canadian bulk foods store founded in September 1982 by Carl O'Field. The store sells common to somewhat specialty foods, such as those that are vegan and non genetically modified. Though the store cannot be considered zero waste due to its heavy use of plastic in both prepackaged and bulk items, it encourages customers to use its Reusable Container Program to reduce waste.

Charity and fundraising
Bulk Barn participated in fundraising for Alzheimer's Canada, reportedly raising over $275,000 (CAD) in 2012.

References

Canadian brands
Retail companies established in 1982
Franchises
Supermarkets of Canada